1998 in Ghana details events of note that happened in Ghana in 1998.

Incumbents
 President: Jerry John Rawlings
 Vice President: John Atta Mills
 Chief Justice: Isaac Kobina Abban

Events

January

February

March
6 - 41st independence anniversary
23 - President Bill Clinton visits Ghana

April

May

June

July
1 - Republic day celebrations held across the country.

August

September

October

November

December
Annual Farmers' Day celebrations held in all regions of the country.

Deaths

23 January - Former president Hilla Limann dies after an illness.

National holidays
 January 1: New Year's Day
 March 6: Independence Day
 May 1: Labor Day
 December 25: Christmas
 December 26: Boxing day

In addition, several other places observe local holidays, such as the foundation of their town. These are also special days.

References